Nazeer Akbarabadi (born Wali Muhammad; 1735 – 1830) was an 18th-century Indian poet known as "Father of Nazm", who wrote Urdu ghazals and nazms under the pen name (takhallus) "Nazeer", most remembered for his poems like  Banjaranama (Chronicle of the Nomad), a satire.

Birth, early years and migration to Akbarabad
His father was Muhammad Farooq and his mother was the daughter of Nawab Sultan Khan who was the governor of Agra Fort. Agra, the Indian city, was known as Akbarabad after Mughal emperor Akbar at that time. He used simple, everyday language in his poems.

Nazeer's date of birth is not certain but most of his biographers believe that he was born in Delhi (then called "Dihli") in 1735 AD. The period of his birth coincided with the decline of the Mughal empire in India. In 1739, Nazeer was still a child when Nadir Shah attacked Delhi and the Mughal emperor Muhammad Shah (also known as "Muhammad Shah Rangila") was arrested. He was later released but countless people were mercilessly killed in Delhi. The horrors of this plunder were still fresh in the minds of people when 18 years later, in 1757 AD, Ahmad Shah Abdali attacked Delhi. People left Delhi for safer cities. Nazeer along with his mother and grandmother also abandoned Delhi and migrated to Akbarabad. At this time, Nazeer was 22-23 years old.

Poetry
It is said that Nazeer's poetic treasure consisted of about 200,000 verses but unfortunately a bigger portion of it is destroyed and only 6000 verses are available in printed form. No other Urdu poet before him, had used as many words as Nazeer did. Nazeer's poetry conveyed the plight of the common people in their own everyday language and was very popular among the masses. It was due to this lack of the "elite" element perhaps that Nazir's genius was not recognized until much later. But in spite of this neglect, some of his poetic treasure is still available and some of his poems, such as "Banjaranama" (chronicle of a nomad/gypsy), "Kaljug nahin karjug hai yeh", "Aadmi Naama" (chronicle of man), etc., became immortal. Such poems find their place in school text books and discerning fans of Urdu poetry will not fail to recognize the greatness of Nazeer's verse.

He left for us about 600 ghazals, although his nazms are said to be more worthy of admiration. In fact, Nazeer's growing popularity is due to his nazms. He was purely a "People's poet" and his nazms reflected various aspects of the daily life of his age, all types of religious and social events with even minor details in which common people can be seen laughing, singing, teasing, playing. He wrote nazams about religious and social festivals, such as Diwali, Holi, Eid, Shab-e-baraat, about fruits and about animals like mouse and birds, about seasons and even inanimate objects, such as paisa, rupaiaa, rotiyaan, aata-daal (meaning "flour" and "lentils"), "pankha" (meaning "fan") and "kakrhi" (Melon). He wrote nazms about different aspects of human life, such as "muflisi" (Urdu word meaning "poverty") and "kohrinamah" (chronicle of a leper). The canvas of Nazeer's nazms is so vast that it encompasses all aspects of human behaviour and every person can find nazms that can suit his taste.

Nazeer Akbarabadi's contemporaries were Mirza Muhammad Rafi Sauda, Mir Taqi Mir, Sheikh Qalandar Bakhsh Jur'at, Insha Allah Khan Insha, and Ghulam Hamdani Mushafi. He was young during the age of Sauda and Mir and might be a middle aged man during the age of Jur'at, Insha and Mushafi.

Death and legacy
Nazeer Akbarabadi died in 1830 AD, at age 95.

Though the era of modern nazm credits Altaf Hussain Hali and Muhammad Husain Azad, Nazeer could arguably be considered "Father of Urdu Nazm" because he preceded them.

Sample poem

Qualities of his poetry 
His poetry has many qualities among them only some are discussed below.

Natural poetry 
Nazeer was the one who laid the foundation of natural poetry which was later continued by Altaf Hussain Hali and Muhammad Husain Azad. The best thing in his poetry is that he never used the hard poetic language and he always tried to give the concepts of ethics and social values.

His poem was named "Aadmi Nama" was mistakenly published "Army Nama" in Pakistan. Similarly all his words "Aadmi" were replaced by "Army" which become controversial by mistake, it was taken farce on large scale."

In popular culture
In 1954, Habib Tanvir, wrote and directed his first significant play Agra Bazar, based on the works and times of Nazir Akbarabadi. It used local residents and folk artist from Okhla village in Delhi and students of Jamia Millia Islamia as actors, a play not staged in a confined space, rather a bazaar, a marketplace.

Further reading
 Nazeer Akbarabadi, translation of criticism by Professor Mohammad Hasan, Asghar Wajahat. Sahitya Akademi, Delhi.
 The Life and Times of Nazir Akbarabadi, by Syed Mohammad Abbas. Vanguard, 1991.
 Kulliyat e Nazeer Akbarabadi

References

External links
 Nazeer Akbarabadi at Kavita Kosh (Hindi)
 Nazeer Akbarabadi poetry

Urdu-language poets
Indian male poets
People from Agra
1735 births
1830 deaths
18th-century Indian Muslims
18th-century Urdu-language writers
Urdu-language writers from India
Poets from Uttar Pradesh
Urdu-language writers from British India
Urdu-language writers from Mughal India
Urdu-language religious writers
18th-century Indian poets
19th-century Indian poets
19th-century Indian male writers
18th-century male writers